Rajya Sabha elections were held on various dates in 1953, to elect members of the Rajya Sabha, Indian Parliament's upper chamber.

Elections
Elections were held to elect members from various states.

Members elected
The following members are elected in the elections held in 1953. They are members for the term 1953-1959 and retire in year 1959, except in case of the resignation or death before the term.
The list is incomplete.

State - Member - Party

By-elections
The following by-elections were held in the year 1953.

State - Member - Party

References

1953 elections in India
1953